Colonial BancGroup Inc. was a bank holding company headquartered in Montgomery, Alabama, United States that failed in 2009.  It was a financial services company that, through its subsidiaries, provided diversified services, including retail and commercial banking, wealth management services, mortgage banking and insurance.  The company was in the top 50 largest banks in the US prior to its failure and its subsidiary, Colonial Bank, operated 346 branches in the states of Alabama, Georgia, Florida, Nevada and Texas.

The company ran into problems after it was revealed that it had bought $1 billion in mortgages from Taylor, Bean & Whitaker that Taylor Bean had forged, in one of the biggest fraud cases in history.  On  August 25, 2009 it filed for Chapter 11 bankruptcy.  The banking assets and branches were sold to BB&T bank under a Federal Deposit Insurance Corporation (FDIC) brokered deal.

History
The Bank was founded in 1974 in Montgomery, Alabama as Southland Bancorporation.  The company changed its name to The Colonial BancGroup, Inc. in 1981.

The principal activity of the BancGroup was to supervise and coordinate the business of its subsidiaries, and to provide them with capital and services. The BancGroup derived substantially all of its income from dividends received from Colonial Bank, its banking subsidiary. The BancGroup's subsidiary Colonial Brokerage, Inc. provided full service and discount brokerage services and investment advice. The BancGroup had interests in several residential and commercial real estate developments located in the southeastern United States, as well as two in the central Texas area.

On January 31, 2006, Colonial Bank sold its interest in Goldleaf Technologies, Inc., which provides Internet and automated clearing house services to community banks.

At the end of the fourth quarter of 2008, Colonial Bancgroup had a Texas ratio of 53.4%, up from a figure of 25% in the first quarter of 2008.

Taylor, Bean & Whitaker Mortgage fraud
Between 2004 and 2009 management at Taylor, Bean & Whitaker fraudulently sold $400 million worth of fake mortgages to Colonial with the help of a Colonial bank executive. The fraud scheme was between 2002 and 2009, and involved Catherine Kissick, former senior vice president of Colonial Bank and head of Colonial Bank's Mortgage Warehouse Lending Division, and her co-conspirators, including former Taylor, Bean & Whitaker Chairman Lee Farkas, whereby they defrauded various entities and individuals, including Colonial Bank, Colonial BancGroup, Taylor, Bean & Whitaker, the Troubled Asset Relief Program, and the investing public.

According to court documents, Taylor, Bean & Whitaker began running overdrafts in its master bank account at Colonial Bank. Starting in 2002, Kissick, Farkas and their co-conspirators engaged in a series of fraudulent actions to cover up the overdrafts, first by sweeping overnight money from one Taylor, Bean & Whitaker account with excess in another, and later through the fictitious "sales" of mortgage loans to Colonial Bank, a fraud the conspirators dubbed "Plan B." Court records show the conspirators sent mortgage data to Colonial Bank for loans that didn't exist or that Taylor, Bean & Whitaker had already committed or sold to other third-party investors.

Kissick admitted she knew and understood she and her co-conspirators had caused Colonial Bank to pay Taylor, Bean & Whitaker for assets that were worthless to the bank. As a result, false information was entered on Colonial Bank's books and records, giving the appearance that the bank owned interests in legitimate pools of mortgage loans when in fact the pools had no value and could not be securitized or sold.

The fraud caused Colonial BancGroup to file materially false financial data with the SEC regarding its assets in annual reports contained in Forms 10-K and quarterly filings contained in Forms 10-Q. Colonial BancGroup's materially false financial data included overstated assets for mortgage loans that had little to no value.

The fraud in total would cost Colonial over $1.9 billion.

Disclosure and failure
Colonial disclosed its legal problems on August 4, 2009, stating that federal agents had executed a search warrant at its mortgage warehouse lending offices in Orlando, Fla. and that it had been forced to sign a cease and desist order with the Federal Reserve and regulators at the end of last month in relation to its accounting practices and its recognition of losses.  On August 14 it was announced that BB&T would buy Colonial's branches and deposits in a deal with the FDIC.

This was the biggest bank failure of 2009.  On August 25 Colonial BancGroup filed for Chapter 11 bankruptcy. The bankruptcy case's name is "In re Colonial BancGroup Inc, U.S. Bankruptcy Court, Middle District of Alabama (Montgomery), No. 09-32303".

PricewaterhouseCoopers lawsuit
The bankruptcy trustee for Taylor, Bean & Whitaker Mortgage Corp., once one of the nation’s biggest privately held mortgage companies, is suing PricewaterhouseCoopers as the auditor of Colonial Bank, seeking $5.5 billion in damages. The trustee alleged in the 2013 suit that PricewaterhouseCoopers was negligent in not detecting a massive fraud scheme that brought down Taylor, Bean & Whitaker, which led to the 2009 collapse of Colonial Bank, a Montgomery, Ala. bank with $25 billion in assets, one of the biggest U.S. bank collapses during the Great Recession.

The closely watched case could lead to billions of dollars in damages depending on how a jury answers a fundamental question in accounting: How much responsibility do auditors have for catching fraud? The suit has since been settled for an undisclosed sum in August 2016.

PricewaterhouseCoopers has maintained in court documents that its responsibility is to follow accounting principles — which might not necessarily detect fraud. But in a pretrial brief issued by the trustee, former PricewaterhouseCoopers chairman Dennis Nally is quoted in a 2007 Wall Street Journal article saying that the "audit profession has always had a responsibility for the detection of fraud".

References

Companies based in Montgomery, Alabama
Companies that filed for Chapter 11 bankruptcy in 2009
Defunct banks of the United States
Banks established in 1981
1981 establishments in Alabama
Banks disestablished in 2009
2009 disestablishments in Alabama
Banks based in Alabama